Camino is a 2008 Spanish drama film directed by Javier Fesser starring Nerea Camacho as the title character alongside Carmen Elías, Mariano Venancio and Manuela Vellés.

The plot is inspired by (and dedicated to) the real story of Alexia González-Barros, a girl who died from spinal cancer at age 14 in 1985 and who is in process of canonization. The girl's family (related to the Opus Dei) did not agree with the film and so controversy mired the film since the very beginning, and arguably only served to increase interest in the film.

The film swept the 23rd Goya Awards, winning in 6 categories, including 4 of the Big 5 (Best Picture, Director, Original Screenplay and Actress).

Plot 
Camino and her family belong to the Opus Dei. She develops a crush for a boy (Cuco/Jesús). Camino's elder sister is a Catholic acolyte, deliberately kept from contacting her family. Suppressing open signs of normal maternal grief, the mother seems almost inhuman in urging her dying daughter to "offer up" her suffering for Jesus. The father struggles to protect his daughter from a concerted effort to canonize her (even before her death) by his wife, elder daughter, and Catholic officials. Even the hospital medical staff seem to be complicit in this.

Jesús, the name Camino invokes, is not Christ, but that of her normal schoolgirl crush. This is shown in dream sequences she experiences throughout the film.

Cast

Release 
The film premiered at the San Sebastián International Film Festival's official competition. Distributed by Alta Classics, it was theatrically released in Spain on 17 October 2008.

Reception 
The film won six Goya Awards, including best picture, best director, and best original screenplay.

Criticism by the González-Barros family 
Alexia's siblings said that the film was a distortion of the girl's history. They also objected to Fesser's use of Alexia's full name in his dedication, despite him having undertaken not to directly identify her.

In reaction to the film, director Pedro Delgado released a documentary about the life of Alexia González-Barros in 2011, including video footage from the latter's family archives.

Accolades 

|-
| align = "center" rowspan = "15" | 2009 || 14th Forqué Awards || colspan = "2" | Best Picture ||  || 
|-
| rowspan = "7" | 23rd Goya Awards || colspan = "2" | Best Film ||  || rowspan = "7" | 
|-
| Best Director || Javier Fesser ||  
|-
| Best Original Screenplay || Javier Fesser || 
|-
| Best Actress || Carme Elias || 
|-
| Best Supporting Actor || Jordi Dauder || 
|-
| Best New Actress || Nerea Camacho || 
|-
| Best Special Effects || Arturo Balseiro, Ferrán Piquer, Raúl Romanillos || 
|-
| rowspan = "6" | 18th Actors and Actresses Union Awards || Best Film Actress in a Leading Role || Carmen Elías ||  || rowspan = "6" | 
|-
| Best Film Actor in a Leading Role || Mariano Venancio ||  
|-
| Best Film Actor in a Secondary Role || Jordi Dauder || 
|-
| rowspan = "2" | Best Film Actress in a Minor Role || Lola Casamayor || 
|-
| Ana Gracia || 
|-
| Best Film Actor in a Minor Role || Pepe Ocio || 
|- 
| Vilnius International Film Festival || colspan = "2" | Audience's Award for Best Film ||  ||
|}

See also 
 List of Spanish films of 2008

References

External links 
 

2008 films
2008 drama films
2000s Spanish-language films
Best Film Goya Award winners
Films featuring a Best Actress Goya Award-winning performance
Films featuring a Best Supporting Actor Goya Award-winning performance
Films shot in Madrid
Films about Opus Dei
Films shot in Almería
Spanish drama films
2000s Spanish films
Films about dreams